The sixth season of the Syfy reality television series Face Off premiered on January 14, 2014. The season features 15 prosthetic-makeup artists competing against each other to create makeup effects. In this season, the judges have the power to save one contestant who would normally be eliminated.  The grand prize for the sixth season is a VIP trip from Kryolan to one of their 85 locations, a 2014 Fiat 500, and $100,000. Rashaad Santiago of The Bronx, New York City, New York won this season.

Judges
 Ve Neill
 Glenn Hetrick
 Neville Page
 McKenzie Westmore (Host)
 Michael Westmore (mentor)

Contestants

Contestant progress

 The contestant won Face Off.
  The contestant was a runner-up.
 The contestant won a Spotlight Challenge.
 The contestant was part of a team that won the Spotlight Challenge.
 The contestant was in the top in the Spotlight Challenge.
 The contestant was in the bottom in the Spotlight Challenge.
 The contestant was a teammate of the eliminated contestant in the Spotlight Challenge.
 The contestant was eliminated.
 The contestant was deemed the least successful but was saved by the judges and was not eliminated.
‡ The contestant won the Foundation Challenge.

Episodes

{| class="wikitable plainrowheaders" style="width:100%; margin:auto;"
|-
|-style="color:white"
! scope="col" style="background-color: #835c9b; width:12em; color:white;" |No. inseries
! scope="col" style="background-color: #835c9b; width:12em; color:white;" |No. inseason
! scope="col" style="background-color: #835c9b; color:white;" |Title  
! scope="col" style="background-color: #835c9b; width:12em; color:white;" |Original air date 
! scope="col" style="background-color: #835c9b; width:12em; color:white;" |U.S. viewers(million)
! scope="col" style="background-color: #835c9b; width:12em; color:white;" |18-49Rating
 
  
 
 
 
 
 
  
 
 
 
 
 
 
 
|}

References

External links
 
 

2014 American television seasons
Face Off (TV series)